Vuelta Chihuahua Internacional (Vuelta a Chihuahua) was a stage race held annually in October in the Mexican state of Chihuahua.  The Vuelta a Chihuahua was first contested in 2005, as part of the UCI America Tour schedule, and was run over seven stages (days).  The Chihuahua's diverse geography, including mountains, forests, and farmland, contributed to the challenge of the race.

In 2009, the UCI upgraded the Vuelta a Chihuahua from a 2.2 to a 2.1 event. In 2010, the Vuelta a Chihuahua was dropped from the UCI America Tour, but was still ran that year, and 2011, as a standalone event. The Vuelta a Chihuahua ceased after the 2011 event.

Winners

External links
  Official website
 Cycling News: Vuelta Chihuahua Internacional (2009 results)

UCI America Tour races
Cycle races in Mexico
Recurring sporting events established in 2006
2006 establishments in Mexico
Autumn events in Mexico